Child Lake 164A is an Indian reserve of the Beaver First Nation in Alberta, located within Mackenzie County. It is 32 kilometers northwest of Fort Vermilion. The reserve takes its name from a nearby lake where a child once drowned.

Geography 
The locality of Eleske is on the Child Lake 164A reserve.

Demographics 
In the 2016 Canadian Census, Child Lake 164A recorded a population of 216 living in 62 of its 62 total private dwellings.

References

Indian reserves in Alberta